VeggieBoards is one of the largest and most active internet
forums for vegetarians and vegans. Typical forum topics include issues relating to
vegetarianism, veganism, animal welfare, animal rights, the
environment, health, physical fitness and recipes. As of June 2012, the forum had over 48,000 registered members and
more than 3 million posts. In May 2012, VeggieBoards changed ownership for the first time since its creation.  It is now owned by Huddler.

History
VeggieBoards was launched in December 2000. The first big group of members came from the message board at Vegan Outreach that went defunct early in 2001. The next
big wave of new members came in April 2003 when the message board at VegWeb closed down and the members were encouraged to sign up with
Veggieboards. Initially the forum software was UBB.classic, but it was replaced with vBulletin some time between 2001-2002. All user accounts were lost in the process, so the users had to sign up again.

Recognition, criticism and the media
Reviews and opinions on the site were generally positive, highlighting the "good (though juvenile) conversations"  and the large group of regular posters.
Posts from VeggieBoards have also been quoted in the mainstream media.

VeggieBoards has been nominated for the VegNews magazine's Veggie
Awards several times, most recently in 2009.

See also
 List of Internet forums

References

External links
VeggieBoards
ForumAmca

Internet forums
Vegetarian publications and websites
Veganism
Vegetarian communities
Internet properties established in 2000